Graham cracker crust is a style of pie crust made from crushed graham crackers.  Graham crackers are a sweet American cracker made from unbleached, whole wheat graham flour. The crust is usually flavored and stiffened with butter or vegetable oil and sometimes sugar.  Graham cracker crust is a very common type of crust for cheesecakes and cream pies in America. 

Graham cracker pie crusts are available as a mass-produced product in the United States, and typically consist of the prepared crust pressed into a disposable aluminum pie pan.

Variations use crushed cookies or Nilla wafers as substitutes for the graham crackers.

Origin
The invention of the graham cracker crust is credited to Monroe Boston Strause, who was known as the Pie King and also invented the chiffon pie.

References

Pies
Food ingredients